Monsoon is a 2014 Canadian documentary film by Sturla Gunnarsson about the monsoon weather system in India.

The film was shot in India in the extra-high-definition 4K format with Red Epic cameras.

The film was included in the list of Canada's Top Ten feature films of 2014, selected by a panel of filmmakers and industry professionals organized by TIFF. Subsequently the film finished first in the audience balloting, of the features in "Canada's Top Ten".

The film had a theatrical run in 2015; meanwhile Gunnarsson was quoted as being in discussions with an American distributor, following Monsoon's United States premiere at the 2015 Palm Springs International Film Festival.

References

External links

2014 films
2014 documentary films
Canadian documentary films
Films shot in India
Rain in culture
Climate of India
Weather events in India
Documentary films about India
Documentary films about environmental issues
2010s Canadian films